Isaac D'Israeli (11 May 1766 – 19 January 1848) was a British writer, scholar and the father of British Prime Minister Benjamin Disraeli. He is best known for his essays and his associations with other men of letters.

Life and career
Isaac was born in Enfield, Middlesex, England, the only child of Benjamin D'Israeli (1730–1816), a Sephardic Jewish merchant who had immigrated from Cento, Italy, in 1748, and his second wife, Sarah Syprut de Gabay Villa Real (1742/3–1825). Isaac received much of his education in Leiden. At the age of 16, he began his literary career with some verses addressed to Samuel Johnson. He became a frequent guest at the table of the publisher John Murray and became one of the noted bibliophiles of the time.

In 1797 D'Israeli published Vaurien, a romantic novel set in radical circles following the French Revolution. Conservative commentators praised the book for its mockery of radicals in England and depiction of Vaurien, who has come from France to ferment revolution. Yet they were perturbed by his depiction of a prostitute, who is kindly and was forced into prostitution to feed her family after her husband was ruined by a litigious neighbour for stealing an apple. Moreover, they were shocked by a chapter in which Disraeli launched a staunch defence of the Jewish community condemning the way Jews were treated in England.

On 10 February 1802, D'Israeli married Maria Basevi (1774/5–1847), who came from another London merchant family of Italian-Jewish descent. The marriage was a happy one, producing five children: Sarah ("Sa"; 1802–1859); Benjamin ("Ben" or "Dizzy"; 1804–1881); Naphtali (b. 1807, died in infancy); Raphael ("Ralph"; 1809–1898); and Jacobus ("James" or "Jem"; 1813–1868). The children were named according to Jewish customs and the boys were all circumcised. Religiously, however, Isaac D'Israeli appears to have set aside his Jewish beliefs. In the midst of an eight-year dispute with the Bevis Marks Synagogue and on the advice of his friend, historian Sharon Turner, all his children were baptised into the Church of England in 1817. In 1833 he published a severely critical analysis of contemporary Judaism, The Genius of Judaism. He himself did not receive baptism, however, and never indicated any desire to exchange Judaism for Christianity. He did attend the inauguration ceremonies of the Reform Synagogue at Burton Street, London.

He penned a handful of English adaptations of traditional tales from the Middle East, wrote a few historical biographies, and published a number of poems. His most popular work was a collection of essays entitled Curiosities of Literature. The work contained myriad anecdotes about historical persons and events, unusual books, and the habits of book-collectors. The work was very popular and sold widely in the 19th century, reaching its eleventh edition (the last to be revised by the author) in 1839. It was still in print when the Encyclopædia Britannica entry was written in 1911. His book The Life and Reign of Charles I (1828) resulted in his being awarded the degree of D.C.L. from the University of Oxford.

In 1841, he became blind and, though he underwent an operation, his sight was not restored. He continued writing with his daughter as his amanuensis. In this way he produced Amenities of Literature (1841) and completed the revision of his work on Charles I. He died of influenza at age 81, at his home, Bradenham House, in Buckinghamshire, less than a year after the death of his wife in the spring of 1847.

D'Israeli's daughter-in-law, the wife of his eldest son, Benjamin, erected a monument to him in June 1862 following his death. It stands on a hill near Hughenden Manor, the Disraelis' country house in Buckinghamshire.

Major works
Curiosities of Literature (5 vols. [1791–1823]; 3 vols. [1824])
A Dissertation on Anecdotes [1793]
An Essay on the Literary Character [1795]
Miscellanies; or, Literary Recreations [1796]
Romances [1799]
Flim-Flams!, or the Life and Errors of My Uncle and the Amours of My Aunt [1805-6]
Commentaries on the Life and Reign of Charles the First, King of England (5 vols. 1828-1831)
Amenities of Literature [1841]
Calamities of Authors [1812–3]
Quarrels of Authors [1814]
The Genius of Judaism [1833]

References

External links 

 
 
 
 Complete text of the Curiosities Of Literature.
 

1766 births
1848 deaths
19th-century English non-fiction writers
19th-century English male writers
19th-century Sephardi Jews
Bibliophiles
English blind people
Deaths from influenza
English Jewish writers
English male non-fiction writers
English non-fiction writers
English people of Italian-Jewish descent
British people of Italian-Jewish descent
English Sephardi Jews
People from Enfield, London
Parents of prime ministers of the United Kingdom